Round 2 is the second studio album recorded by American R&B group The Stylistics, released in October 1972 on the Avco label.   It was produced by Thom Bell and recorded at Sigma Sound Studios in Philadelphia.

History
The album reached #32 on the Billboard 200 and #3 on the R&B albums chart.  It features the hit singles "Break Up to Make Up", "I'm Stone in Love with You", and "You'll Never Get to Heaven (If You Break My Heart)".  All three singles reached the top-ten on the R&B charts.  "Break Up to Make Up" and "I'm Stone in Love with You" also reached the top-ten on the Billboard Hot 100.

Track listing

Personnel
Russell Thompkins, Jr. – lead vocals
Airrion Love, James Smith, Herb Murrell, James Dunn – backing vocals
Linda Creed, Barbara Ingram – additional backing vocals
Norman Harris, Roland Chambers, Tony Bell, Eli Tartarsky – guitar
Ronnie Baker – bass
Earl Young – drums
Larry Washington – congas
Vince Montana – percussion
Thom Bell – piano, harpsichord
Joe DeAngelis, Stephanie Fauber, Robert Martin – French horn
Rocco Bene, Bobby Hartzell – trumpet
Jack Faith – alto saxophone, flute
George Shaw – flute
Vincent Forchetti, Bob Moore, Richard Genevese – trombone
Don Renaldo, Tony Sinagoga, Albert Berone, Rudy Malizia, Angelo Pretrella, Romeo Di Stefano, Charles Apollonia, Davis Barnett, Richard Jones, Herschel Wise – strings
Mary Gale – harp
Fredric Cohen – oboe

Charts

Singles

References

External links
 

1972 albums
The Stylistics albums
Albums produced by Thom Bell
Albums arranged by Thom Bell
Albums recorded at Sigma Sound Studios
Avco Records albums